Queanbeyan was an electoral district of the Legislative Assembly in the Australian state of New South Wales from 1859 to 1913, in the Queanbeyan area. It replaced parts of the electoral district of United Counties of Murray and St Vincent and the electoral district of Southern Boroughs. It was merged with the electoral district of Monaro in 1913, when much of its former territory had been absorbed in the Australian Capital Territory.

Members for Queanbeyan

Election results

References

Former electoral districts of New South Wales
Constituencies established in 1859
1859 establishments in Australia
Constituencies disestablished in 1913
1913 disestablishments in Australia